Nižný Skálnik is a village and municipality in the Rimavská Sobota District of the Banská Bystrica Region of southern Slovakia. Located between hilly and flat area, agriculture played an important role in local economy. The village was first mentioned in 1334. During the Hussite wars on Slovak territory, the hill above the village had been fortified by the Hussites, who constructed the Maginhrad fortress, now in ruins. Most important sightseeing is classical Lutheran church from 1802.

The village is the birthplace of the 19th-century Slovak historians Matej Holko and Ján Feješ.

References

External links
 
Article about Carnival in Nižný Skálnik
Article about Maginhrad
http://www.e-obce.sk/obec/niznyskalnik/4-kulturne_dedicstvo.html

Villages and municipalities in Rimavská Sobota District